Cage to Rattle is the fifth studio album by American rock band Daughtry, released on July 27, 2018, through RCA Records.  This is their first studio album in five years since Baptized in 2013. At just ten songs, this album is Daughtry's shortest album to date. It is also their first album with drummer Brandon Maclin. Upon its release the album received predominantly positive reviews from music critics, with some calling it the group's strongest and most mature work. This was Daughtry's last album to be released on RCA Records.

Background
Daughtry began recording the album back in April 2016 at the Blackbird Studios in Nashville, Tennessee and concluded in May 2018.

Daughtry said about the album, "Cage to Rattle has been the most fun yet most challenging album we've ever made. It's a musical stew we've been cooking up for more than 2 years and we can't wait to satisfy the appetites of our amazing fans who've been patiently waiting for this record!".

Singles
"Deep End" is the first single and was released on June 5, 2018.
"As You Are" was the second single and was released on June 5, 2019 as a celebrations of Pride Month.

Reception

The album received positive reviews from critics. AllMusic's Stephen Thomas Erlewine wrote that the album showed the band moving away from their previous hard rock style to encompass a more mellow stance. Erlewine wrote that the few "rock signifiers" used by Daughtry were "in service to an album that is otherwise adult alternative easy listening."

Charts and performance
Cage to Rattle debuted at number 10 on the US Billboard 200 with 26,000 album-equivalent units, of which 24,000 were pure album sales. It is Daughtry's fifth US top 10 album.

In the United Kingdom, Cage to Rattle debuted at number 14 on the UK Albums Chart, becoming Daughtry's second highest debut in the UK, just behind their self-titled debut album that opened at number 13 in 2006. Cage to Rattle sold 3,758 units in its first week.

In Scotland, Cage to Rattle opened at number eight, which is Daughtry's highest debut in the country.

Track listing

Personnel
Daughtry
Chris Daughtry – lead vocals, third guitar
Josh Steely – lead guitar, backing vocals
Brian Craddock – rhythm guitar, backing vocals
Josh Paul – bass, backing vocals
Elvio Fernandes – keyboards, backing vocals
Brandon Maclin – drums, backing vocals

Additional personnel
Chris Daughtry – composer
Josh Paul – composer
Brian Craddock – composer
Elvio Fernandes – composer
Kevin Boettger – assistant engineer
Chris Bellman – mastering
Martin Cooke – mixing assistant
Rich Costey – mixer (tracks: 3 & 7)
Eric Darken – additional percussion, programming
Christopher Feldmann – art direction, design
Luke Forehand – assistant engineer
Nicolas Fournier – mixing assistant
Matthew Glasbey – mixing assistant
Chad Howat – additional keyboards, programming
Jacquire King – producer
Kolton Lee – engineer
Jason Mott – assistant engineer
Danny Pellegrini – assistant engineer
Lowell Reynolds – engineer
Andrew Scheps – mixer (tracks: 1, 2, 4, 5, 6, 8, 9, 10)
Spencer Thomson – additional guitar, keyboards, programming

Charts

References

2018 albums
19 Recordings albums
Albums produced by Jacquire King
Daughtry (band) albums
RCA Records albums